Alberto Contreras (died 1958) was a Spanish-born stage and film actor who settled in Argentina. He portrayed don Florín in the play La sirena varada, written by Alejandro Casona.

Selected filmography
 Our Natacha (1944)
 The Sin of Julia (1946)
 A Story of the Nineties (1949)

References

Bibliography
 Alfred Charles Richard. Censorship and Hollywood's Hispanic image: an interpretive filmography, 1936-1955. Greenwood Press, 1993.

External links

Year of birth unknown
1958 deaths
Argentine male film actors
Argentine male stage actors
Spanish male film actors
Spanish male stage actors
Spanish emigrants to Argentina